A partial lunar eclipse took place on Wednesday, September 14, 1932. It was the second of 2 nearly total eclipses, with only the north edge of the moon failing to enter the earth's umbral shadow. It was part of Saros series 136 and preceded the first total eclipse on September 26, 1950.

Visibility

Related lunar eclipses

Saros series 
It was part of Saros series 136.

Tritos series 
 Preceded: Lunar eclipse of October 17, 1921
 Followed: Lunar eclipse of July 16, 1954

Tzolkinex 
 Preceded: Lunar eclipse of August 4, 1925
 Followed: Lunar eclipse of October 28, 1939

See also 
List of lunar eclipses and List of 21st-century lunar eclipses

External links 
 Saros series 136
 

1932-09
1932 in science